Gyland is a village in the municipality of Flekkefjord in Agder county in Norway. It is located in the northeastern part of Flekkefjord along the river Gylandselva, just a short distance north of the lake Kumlevollvatnet. The Sørlandet Line runs just south of the village, stopping at Gyland Station. Now a small chapel is located in Gyland where the old church was once standing.

Name
The municipality (originally the parish) was named after the old Gyland farm (Old Norse: Gýjuland), where Gyland Church was originally located. The first element is the old name of the river that flows past the farm (Old Norse: Gýja or Gý) and the last element is land which means "land".

References

External links
Weather information for Gyland 

Flekkefjord
Villages in Agder